The Roland SP-404 Sampling Workstation is a discontinued sampler made by Roland Corporation. Released in  2005, it is part of the SP family and successor to where Boss Corporation’s SP-505 sampler left off. The sampler was succeeded by the SP-555 in 2008, but was later given its own upgrade as the Roland SP-404SX Linear Wave Sampler in  2009. Another upgrade, the Roland SP-404A Linear Wave Sampler was released in  2017. A third upgrade, the SP-404MKII was released in 2021. The Roland SP-404 has played a huge role in influencing the sound of popular music genre Lo-Fi Beats.

Features

OG / SX / A 
Having the traditional features of the Roland Grooveboxes, the 404 has the ability to record audio directly via line/mic, or import/export industry-standard WAV and AIF files via CompactFlash card. An onboard pattern sequencer allows up to 8,000 notes to be recorded in real time.

Pattern data can be quantized and up to 24 patterns, each 1–99 measures long, can be stored in the internal memory. Using a 1GB CompactFlash card, sampling times can be as long as approximately 772 minutes in Lo-Fi mode, or up to 386 minutes long in Standard mode.

However, the 404 (along with its own upgrades) lacks the D-Beam feature of the previous SP-808 and SP-606 installments. Although the first bank comes with preset samples that are protected, these samples can be removed by holding "cancel" as you turn it on. This allows you to delete the samples from the protected bank.

MKII 
Released in 2021, the 404MKII was a significant upgrade, while retaining the unit's original form factor. Among the new features were an OLED display capable of showing sample waveforms, 16 GB of internal memory, USB-C and 32-note polyphony. The device was also given a new "Skip Back Sampling" feature with the addition of a "Mark" Button. This feature provides users the option to record the most recent 40 seconds of usage with the press of the button.

In popular culture
A number of musicians have used either the SP-303 and/or the SP-404 as part of their production and performance.

These include Jel, Odd Nosdam, Alias, J Dilla, Madlib, Joji, MF Doom, Jneiro Jarel, Milo, Flying Lotus, James Blake, Samiyam, Ras G, Teebs, Grimes, Pictureplane, Four Tet, Beck Hansen, Bradford Cox of Deerhunter and Atlas Sound, Radiohead, Animal Collective, Spindrift, Toro y Moi, Broadcast, John Maus, Ellie Goulding, El Guincho, Illmind, Dibia$e, Jim James of My Morning Jacket, Oneohtrix Point Never (Daniel Lopatin), Matt Mondanile of Ducktails, Devo, Mad Professor, and many others.

Jan Linton was hired by Roland in 2005 to produce a promotional European sound card for the SP404.

See also
 Roland MS-1 Digital Sampler
 Roland SP-808
 Roland SP-606
 Roland SP-555

References

Further reading

External links
 Roland SP-404 Sampling Workstation, Roland SP-404SX/SP-404A Linear Wave Sampler
 SP-Forums.com - An active forum dedicated to Roland's SP range

SP-404
Samplers (musical instrument)
Roland
Workstations
Grooveboxes
Music sequencers
Sound modules
Music workstations
Hip hop production
Japanese inventions